The most recent census of Bosnia and Herzegovina, the 2013 census (Popis stanovništva, domaćinstava i stanova u Bosni i Hercegovini, 2013. / Попис становништва, домаћинстава и станова у Босни и Херцеговини, 2013.), took place from 1 October until 15 October 2013 with a reference , 22 years after the previous census. It was the first census after the Bosnian War. It was organized by the Central Census Bureau of Bosnia and Herzegovina and supported by the European Union.

Preliminary results of the census were published on 5 November 2013, revealing that 3,791,622 people were enumerated. The final results, including ethnicity data, were planned to be published in the second half of 2014, when data processing would be completed. , the final results had still not been released, due to a dispute between the Federation of Bosnia and Herzegovina and Republika Srpska statistical agencies.

The Steering Committee of the International Monitoring Operation on the Population and Housing Censuses in Bosnia and Herzegovina, the international observers by the census process, reported in March 2016 that a new director was appointed to the national statistical agency in December 2015, who could decide on the blocking issues, and that the result of the 2013 census had to be published by July 2016. On 30 June 2016, the official results were published. The census results are contested by the Republika Srpska statistical office and by Bosnian Serb politicians, who oppose the inclusion of non-permanent Bosnian residents in the figures. The population according to the final results is lower than in the preliminary results published in 2013. The European Union's statistics office, Eurostat, concluded in May 2016 that the methodology used by the Bosnian statistical agency is in line with international recommendations.

Results

Preliminary results

Final results

Ethnic groups 

The final results published on 30 June 2016 included statistics on ethnic groups in Bosnia and Herzegovina.

Religion

Census 

Census covered the following topics:
 Usual place of residence
 Name
 Name of father or mother's surname
 Sex
 Date of birth and identification number
 Place of birth
 Presence
 Length and purpose of presence / absence in the list
 Place of residence immediately after birth
 Place of residence of the person at the time of the 1991 census
 If the person was a refugee from Bosnia and Herzegovina
 If the person was displaced person in Bosnia and Herzegovina
 If the person has formally legal status of displaced persons and intends to return to place from which the displaced
 A place in Bosnia and Herzegovina which the person moved and the year of immigration
 Whether the person ever lived outside of Bosnia and Herzegovina years or more
 Month and year immigration and the state from which a person moved
 Reasons for immigration to Bosnia and Herzegovina
 Legal marital status
 Common-law communities
 Number of live births and the month and year of their birth
 Nationality
 Ethnic/national origin
 Mother tongue
 Religion
 Literacy
 Highest completed school
 Education
 Schools attended by the person
 Current status activities
 Status in employment
 Branch of economic activity companies (at work)
 Occupation
 Main source of means of livelihood
 Whether the person is dependent
 Activity of the breadwinner
 Place of work or school attendance and frequency of return in place of permanent residence
 Functional ability of a person to perform daily activities and cause of disability
 Length of stay in the country and abroad for temporary civilian stay and work in another country and place of residence in Bosnia and Herzegovina for them and their family members

See also 
Demographics of Bosnia and Herzegovina

References

Further reading

External links 

Population
Censuses in Bosnia and Herzegovina
Bosnia and Herzegovina
2016 in Bosnia and Herzegovina
2016 controversies